Merscheid is a village in the commune of Heiderscheid, in north-western Luxembourg.  , the village has a population of 172, and it is known for its picturesque countryside and natural beauty. The village is surrounded by rolling hills, forests, and meadows, making it a popular destination for hiking, biking, and other outdoor activities.

References

Villages in Luxembourg
Wiltz (canton)